The Diocese of Karimnagar is  a diocese of Church of South India in Telangana state of India.The diocese is one among the 22 dioceses of Church of South India.

History of the Diocese
The Wesleyan Methodist Missionaries from England began working since 1879 in the Districts of Hyderabad, Medak, Nizamabad, Karimnagar and Nalgonda. As a result of their mission work churches were established along with Schools and Hospitals. After the formation of Church of
South India in the year 1947, Karimnagar and Nalgonda areas from Medak were annexed to the Dornakal Diocese. Diocese of Karimnagar was formed in the year 1978 by bifurcating Dornakal Diocese. The churches in the district of Karimnagar and Nalgonda were bifurcated from Dornakal Diocese along with Warangal District to form the new diocese.

Bishops

Before the formation of the Church of South India
 V. S. Azariah
 A. B. Eliott (1945-1955)

After the formation of the Church of South India before bifurcation
 A. B. Eliott (1945-1955)
 P. Solomon (1955-1978)

Post-bifurcation from the Diocese of Dornakal
 B. Prabhudass (1978-1982)
 G. Benjamin Devasahayam (1982-1987)
 K. E. Swamidass (1987-1992)
 S. John Theodore (1992-2007)
 P. Surya Prakash (2007-2014)
 K. Reuben Mark (2015-)

Notable Churches in the Diocese
Wesley Cathedral, Karimnagar
The CSI Wesley Cathedral church was built by the missionaries in the year 1978. Wesley Cathedral has been completely
renovated and rededicated in 2011. The cathedral celebrated its centenary in 2012.
CSI Wesley Church, Jagital

Institutions Under the Diocese
Bishop Prabhudass Memorial Evangelistic Training School, Jagtial
Bishop K.E.Swamidass Laity Training Institute, Karimnagar
C.S.I High School, Karimnagar
C.S.I High School, Alier
C.S.I Mission High School, Parkal
C.S.I Lant Memorial ITI, Karimnagar
C.S.I Primary School, Jagtial

Further reading

References

External links
 

Karimnagar
Christianity in Telangana
Karimnagar